Pickering's Gin is a London Dry style gin that is entirely produced in Edinburgh city centre at the Summerhall Distillery, near the Meadows. Established in 2013 and launched in 2014, the gin is part of the booming market in artisan gins up and down the UK.

The gin is based on an old Indian recipe that is on display in the distillery, dated 1947 and written in Bombay. The gin has 9 ingredients, or botanicals, including, juniper, coriander, cardamom, fennel, anise, angelica, lemon peel, lime peel and cloves.

References

Gins
Products introduced in 2014